Dogliotti's principle is a principle in epidural anaesthesia first described by  Professor Achille Mario Dogliotti in 1933. It is a method for the identification of the epidural space, a potential space. As a needle is advanced through the ligamentum flavum, to the epidural space, with constant pressure applied to the piston of a syringe, loss of resistance occurs once the needle enters the epidural space due to the change in pressure. The identification of this space, allows subsequent administration of epidural anaesthesia, a technique used primarily for analgesia during childbirth.

These use, respectively, saline or air to identify the epidural space. The LORS technique is generally favoured due to the increased complication risk with the LORA technique such as pneumocephalus or air embolism.

See also
 Epidural procedure
 History of neuraxial anesthesia
 Odom's indicator

References

Anesthesia